The 1997–98 SK Rapid Wien season is the 100th season in club history.

Squad statistics

Fixtures and results

Bundesliga

League table

Cup

UEFA Cup

References

1997-98 Rapid Wien Season
Austrian football clubs 1997–98 season